Debundscha is a village in the south-western Region of the republic of Cameroon. It is found at the foot of the Mount Cameroon at its south western corner directly facing the south Atlantic ocean on the Cameroon coast.

The village of Debundscha is included among the five rainiest places in the world which includes Lloró, Mawsynram, the Big Bog and Cherrapunji, with each of them receiving over 10,000 millimeters (400 inches) of rain annually.

History 
The Germans installed a lighthouse in Debundscha in 1904.

Climate 
Its proximity to the equator which is consistently hot and humid, gives Debundscha a long rainy season and a short dry season in a year.
 
The major rainfall falls on the ocean-facing south-western slope of Mount Cameroon and on Debundscha, at the foot of this slope.

See also
Communes of Cameroon
 Wettest places on Earth

References 

Populated places in Southwest Region (Cameroon)